The 1966 Kansas gubernatorial election was held on November 8, 1966. Democratic nominee Robert Docking defeated incumbent Republican William H. Avery with 54.8% of the vote.

Primary elections
Primary elections were held on August 2, 1966.

Democratic primary

Candidates 
Robert Docking, Mayor of Arkansas City
George Hart, former Kansas State Treasurer

Results

Republican primary

Candidates
William H. Avery, incumbent Governor
Dell Crozier

Results

General election

Candidates
Major party candidates
Robert Docking, Democratic
William H. Avery, Republican 

Other candidates
Rolland Ernest Fisher, Prohibition
Carson Crawford, Independent

Results

References

1966
Kansas
Gubernatorial